The 1960 Eisenhower Trophy took place September 28 to October 1 at the Merion Golf Club in Ardmore, Pennsylvania. It was the second World Amateur Team Championship for the Eisenhower Trophy. The tournament was a 72-hole stroke play team event with 32 four-man teams. The best three scores for each round counted towards the team total.

United States won the Eisenhower Trophy, finishing 42 strokes ahead of the silver medalists, Australia. Great Britain and Ireland finished five strokes behind Australia and took the bronze medal while South Africa finished fourth. Jack Nicklaus completed the four rounds in 269, 13 strokes better than anyone else and 19 strokes better than the best non-American, Bruce Devlin.

Teams
32 teams contested the event. Each team had four players with the exception of Ceylon and the United Arab Republic who were represented by only three players. Of the teams that competed in 1958, Iceland, Kenya and Spain were not represented. Ceylon, Denmark, Mexico, Peru, Rhodesia & Nyasaland and the United Arab Republic were represented for the first time.

Scores

Individual leaders
There was no official recognition for the lowest individual scores.

Sources:

References

External links
World Amateur Team Championships on International Golf Federation website

Eisenhower Trophy
Golf in Pennsylvania
Eisenhower Trophy
Eisenhower Trophy
Eisenhower Trophy
Eisenhower Trophy